Coast Guard One is the call sign of any United States Coast Guard aircraft carrying the president of the United States. Similarly, any Coast Guard aircraft carrying the vice president is designated Coast Guard Two.

, there has never been a Coast Guard One flight. Coast Guard Two was activated on September 25, 2009, when then-Vice President Joe Biden took a flight on CG 6019, an HH-60 Jayhawk helicopter, over the recently flooded Atlanta area.

Other executive travel
The Commandant of the Coast Guard often travels aboard a Gulfstream C-37A aircraft whose standard callsign is "Coast Guard Zero One". The aircraft is stationed at Coast Guard Station Washington, D.C.

See also

 Transportation of the president of the United States

References

Presidential aircraft
United States Coast Guard Aviation
Call signs
Transportation of the president of the United States
Vehicles of the United States